Suppose They Gave a War and Nobody Came (also known as War Games, Old Soldiers Never) is a 1970 American drama-comedy film directed by Hy Averback, produced by Fred Engel, and starring Brian Keith, Don Ameche, Tony Curtis, Ernest Borgnine, Suzanne Pleshette, Ivan Dixon, and Pamela Britton. The plot is a mixture of comic and dramatic elements and concerns the reactions of a number of World War II veterans to the contemporary US Army.

The title is derived from an American antiwar slogan from the hippie subculture during the Vietnam War era, popularized by Charlotte E. Keyes in her 1966 article for McCall's magazine titled "Suppose They Gave a War and No One Came".

Plot
Col. Flanders commands a U.S. Army base in the South. To improve relations with the locals, he decides to throw a community dance. He gives the assignment to Warrant Officer Michael M. Nace, sergeants Shannon Gambroni and Jones, and a captain, Myerson.

A bigot named Billy Joe Davis is a big man in town, backed by Harve, a redneck sheriff. Harve considers a pretty barfly, Ramona, to be his girl, so when he catches  Gambroni and her together, he has the sergeant placed under arrest for lewd conduct in public.

Nace is drunk and of no help. Jones, who is black, is refused a loan by Mr. Kruft, a banker in town, so in anger he decides to spring Gambroni from jail. Billy Joe retaliates by calling in his armed militia, so Nace steals a tank from the base and fights back. Harve takes three of the soldiers as his prisoners.

Nace and Jones (in the tank) manage to arrive at the town, where they wreak havoc by running over the stone statue of a Confederate war hero and ram-crash into the local jail, enabling Gambroni to break out.

By the time the dust settles, Col. Flanders and his men have arrived in town to save the day.  The town mayor fires the sheriff for abuse of authority and the military men pledge to repair the damage caused by the tank.

Cast
 Brian Keith as WO Nace
 Tony Curtis as S/Sgt Gambroni
 Ernest Borgnine as Sheriff Harve
 Ivan Dixon as SFC Jones
 Suzanne Pleshette as Ramona
 Tom Ewell as Billy Joe
 Bradford Dillman as Capt. Myerson
 Arthur O'Connell as Kruft
 Maxine Stuart as Zelda
 Pamela Britton as Sgt. Graham
 Don Ameche as Col. Flanders
 Robert Emhardt as Lester Calhoun 
 Christopher Mitchum as Alturi
 Grady Sutton as Rev. Dinwood

Reception
The film earned rentals of $630,000 in North America and $450,000 in other countries, recording an overall loss of $4,160,000.

See also
 List of American films of 1970
 Tank (film) (1984)

References

External links

 
 Suppose They Gave A War and Nobody Came-BFI Database entry.
 Charlotte E. Keyes, "'Suppose They Gave a War and No One Came'" (McCall's, October 1966)

1970 comedy-drama films
American comedy-drama films
American independent films
1970s English-language films
Films directed by Hy Averback
Films scored by Jerry Fielding
Military humor in film
Films about American military personnel
Films about the United States Army
ABC Motion Pictures films
Cinerama Releasing Corporation films
1970s American films